Soltanlı is a village in the Jabrayil District of Azerbaijan. It was occupied by the Armenian forces in 1993. The Army of Azerbaijan recaptured the village on 19 October 2020.

References

External links 

Populated places in Jabrayil District